Moana Pasifika is a rugby union team made up of players from various Pacific Island nations as well as New Zealand or Australian born players of Pasifika heritage, including Fiji, Samoa, Tonga and the Cook Islands. 

The team was originally created for a one-off match against the Māori All Blacks in December 2020, with the future intention of trying to join the Super Rugby competition.

On 14 April 2021, New Zealand Rugby confirmed the side had been granted a conditional licence to join the Super Rugby competition.

On 12 July 2021, the team was granted an unconditional licence, confirming them for the 2022 Super Rugby Pacific season.

The team played its inaugural Super Rugby match on 4 March 2022.

History
On 24 November 2020, Moana Pasifika coach Tana Umaga named a 26-man squad for the match against the Māori All Blacks on 5 December 2020. The team was made up of New Zealand-based players who were international or sevens capped by a Pacific team or identified with a Pacific region. On 5 December 2020, the team played their first match, against the Māori All Blacks at Waikato Stadium. Captained by Sydney born Samoan international Michael Ala'alatoa the side lost to the Māori 28–21.

Super Rugby
The 2021 Super Rugby season, still affected by the COVID-19 pandemic, was played in two regionalised tournaments featuring the five New Zealand Super Rugby sides and the four Australian Super Rugby sides, plus the Western Force who had returned to the tournament having lost their licence at the end of the 2017 Super Rugby season. However, from 2022 onwards a new 12-team tournament had been mooted, and on 13 November 2020, the New Zealand Rugby Union announced Moana Pasifika, along with the Fijian Drua as its preferred partners to join the competition. Further steps were made in March 2021, when the New Zealand Rugby Union agreed to a sharing of broadcast revenue with both Moana Pasifika and the Fijian Drua, and this was followed later in the same month by World Rugby announcing financial, high performance and administrative support for both potential new sides, in order to boost the performances of Pacific Islands at international level, while also being able to stay local instead of heading overseas.

On 14 April 2021, both sides were granted conditional licenses to join Super Rugby in 2022 by the New Zealand Rugby Union.

On 12 July 2021, the team were granted an unconditional licence, confirming them for the 2022 Super Rugby season.

On 30 August 2021, the side was confirmed in Super Rugby for the 2022 and 2023 seasons, beginning with the 2022 Super Rugby Pacific season.

Moana Pasifika will be based in South Auckland, Auckland Region, and will play their fixtures at Mt Smart Stadium until 2028. On the following day, Dynasty Sport was announced as the supplier for the team's on-field kit. Aaron Mauger was then announced as the first coach of the team on 30 September 2021.

On 2 February 2022, Sekope Kepu was named as the inaugural captain of the Moana Pasifika franchise.

Current squad

The squad for the 2023 Super Rugby Pacific season is:

Coaching staff
The following coaching team was appointed for the 2022 Super Rugby Pacific season:

Historic squads
{| class="collapsible collapsed" style=" width: 100%; margin: 0px; border: 1px solid darkgray; border-spacing: 3px;"
|-
! colspan="10" style="background-color:#f2f2f2; cell-border:2px solid black; padding-left: 1em; padding-right: 1em; text-align: center;" |2020 Moana Pasifika squad for match vs. Māori All Blacks
|-
|colspan="10"|The squad for the match vs. Māori All Blacks was:

|-
| width="3%"| 
| width="30%" style="font-size: 95%;" valign="top"|

Props
 Michael Ala'alatoa (c)
 Jordan Lay
 Daniel Lienert-Brown
 Sione Mafileo

Hookers
 Leni Apisai
 Samisoni Taukei'aho

Locks
 Naitoa Ah Kuoi
 Gerard Cowley-Tuioti
 Samipeni Finau
 Zane Kapeli

| width="3%"| 
| width="30%" style="font-size: 95%;" valign="top"|

Loose Forwards
 Nasi Manu
 Marino Mikaele-Tu'u
 Alamanda Motuga
 Pita Gus Sowakula

Scrum-halves
 Folau Fakatava
 Dwayne PolataivaoFly-halves Josh Ioane Stephen Perofeta

| width="3%"| 
| width="30%" style="font-size: 95%;" valign="top"|Centres Vince Aso
 Leicester Fainga'anuku
 Fetuli PaeaWingers Tomasi Alosio
 Jone Macilai-Tori
 Salesi Rayasi
 Asaeli TikoirotumaFullbacks'''
 Etene Nanai-Seturo

(c) Denotes team captain, Bold denotes player is internationally capped.
|}

See also 
 Pacific Islanders rugby union team
 Pasifika (disambiguation)

References

External links
 Moana Pasifika official website

Super Rugby teams
Multinational rugby union teams
Rugby union in Oceania
2020 establishments in Oceania
Rugby clubs established in 2020
Moana Pasifika